Gian Maria Visconti (or Giovanni Maria; 7 September 1388 – 16 May 1412) was the second Visconti Duke of Milan, the son of Gian Galeazzo Visconti and Caterina Visconti. He was known to be cruel and was eventually assassinated. He had no children.

Biography

Visconti was born in Abbiategrasso. Following his father's death, he assumed the title of duke at the age of thirteen, under his mother's regency. The Duchy of Milan soon disintegrated: among the various parties contending its lands, the condottiero Facino Cane prevailed.

Taking advantage of Gian Maria's cruelty, he managed to create in him doubts about Caterina, who was imprisoned in Monza, where she died on 17 October 1404, probably murdered. The duke was famous for his dogs, which were trained to slaughter men.

In 1408, Gian Maria married Antonia Malatesta of Cesena, daughter of Carlo I, lord of Rimini. They had no issue.

A plot by a party of Milanese Ghibellines was raised against the Duke when Facino Cane was terminally ill in Pavia, and Gian Maria was assassinated in front of the church of San Gottardo in Milan. The dying Facino had his officers swear to support Filippo Maria, Gian Maria's brother, who in fact succeeded him.

In literature
 Bellarion, by Raphael Sabatini

References

1388 births
1412 deaths
People from Abbiategrasso
Gian Maria
Gian Maria
Assassinated Italian people
Medieval child monarchs
15th-century Italian nobility
Burials at Milan Cathedral
Murdered royalty